Out of Sight is a 1998 American crime comedy film directed by Steven Soderbergh and written by Scott Frank, adapted from Elmore Leonard's 1996 novel of the same name. The first of several collaborations between Soderbergh and actor George Clooney, it was released on June 26, 1998.

The film stars Clooney and Jennifer Lopez and co-stars Ving Rhames, Don Cheadle, Dennis Farina, Nancy Allen, Steve Zahn, Catherine Keener, and Albert Brooks. There are also special appearances by Michael Keaton, briefly reprising his role as Ray Nicolette from Quentin Tarantino's Jackie Brown the previous year, and Samuel L. Jackson.

The film received Academy Award nominations for Best Adapted Screenplay and Best Film Editing. It won the Edgar Award for Best Screenplay and the National Society of Film Critics awards for Best Film, Best Director, and Best Screenplay. The film led to a short-lived spinoff TV series in 2003 titled Karen Sisco.

Plot
Career bank robber Jack Foley is caught after a spur-of-the-moment robbery in Miami. Sent to Glades Correctional Institution, he deduces that fellow inmate Chino is orchestrating a breakout. Planning his own escape, Jack calls his ex-wife Adele, an out-of-work magician's assistant, to notify his friend and accomplice Buddy.

That night, U.S. Marshal Karen Sisco arrives at the prison, as does Buddy, and spots the escapees tunneling outside. In the confusion, Jack exits the tunnel in a guard's uniform and overpowers Karen. They are forced to share the trunk of her car as Buddy drives them to meet Glenn, an unreliable associate. Karen convinces Glenn to drive off with her, but he crashes the car and flees while she is taken to the hospital.

Karen has a dream about tracking Jack down, but instead of arresting him, they have sex. Determined to join the task force hunting the fugitives, she questions Adele and happens to arrest Chino, who arrives seeking revenge on Jack. Karen is forced to wait in the lobby while the task force raids Buddy’s apartment, but she and Jack spot each other as he and Buddy escape.

Two years earlier, Jack, Buddy, and Glenn were incarcerated at Lompoc Penitentiary, where wealthy inmate Richard Ripley bragged to Glenn about a cache of uncut diamonds hidden at his home in Detroit. Jack saved Richard from being extorted by vicious criminal Maurice "Snoopy" Miller, leading Richard to promise Jack a job. After his release, Jack balked at the menial position and Richard's disdain for his criminal past. Thrown out of the building, he impulsively robbed the bank across the street and was sent to Glades.

In Detroit, Maurice plans to steal the diamonds with his brother-in-law Kenneth, henchman White Boy Bob, and a reluctant Glenn, whom Maurice forces to help kill a rival drug dealer. Jack and Buddy meet Maurice and his crew, agreeing to team up on the robbery. Following Jack to Detroit, Karen questions Maurice's wife Moselle, and defends herself when Kenneth attempts to assault her. Jack finds Karen at her hotel, where they share a romantic interlude at the bar and spend the night together.

Glenn gets cold feet and runs into Karen, who lets him escape but continues to tail Jack. The thieves force their way inside Richard's mansion, but the housekeeper Midge tells them Richard is out of town. While Maurice and his crew struggle to shoot open the safe upstairs, Jack and Buddy find Richard hiding in his study, and discover the diamonds hidden in his fish tank. Richard, in love with Midge, refuses to leave without her and is captured by Maurice.

Jack sends Buddy away with the diamonds and goes back with Buddy's gun. He is held at gunpoint by White Boy Bob, who trips on the stairs and accidentally shoots himself in the head. Jack shoots Kenneth as he attempts to rape Midge, while Karen enters and shoots Maurice in self-defense. Unwilling to return to prison, Jack confronts Karen with his empty gun, imploring her to kill him. Instead, Karen wounds him in the leg and arrests him.

Karen prepares to transport Jack back to Glades, joined by another detainee, Hejira Henry, who mentions having already escaped from prison nine times. Having arranged for him to join Jack, Karen smiles as the van leaves for Florida.

Cast

Production

Development
The source novel's origins lie in a picture Leonard saw in the Detroit News of a beautiful young female federal marshal standing in front of a Miami courthouse with a shotgun resting on her hip. Producer Danny DeVito bought the rights to the book after his success with the 1995 film adaptation of Leonard's novel Get Shorty. Steven Soderbergh had made two films for Universal Pictures when executive Casey Silver offered him Out of Sight with George Clooney attached. However, the filmmaker was close to making another project and hesitated to commit. Silver told him, "These things aren't going to line up very often, you should pay attention."

Casting
Sandra Bullock was originally considered to play Karen Sisco opposite Clooney. According to Soderbergh, "What happened was I spent some time with [Clooney and Bullock] and they actually did have a great chemistry. But it was for the wrong movie. They really should do a movie together, but it was not Elmore Leonard energy."

The character of Foley appealed to Clooney, who as a boy had considered as heroes the bank robbers in movies, citing "the Cagneys and the Bogarts, Steve McQueen and all those guys, the guys who were kind of bad and you still rooted for them. And when I read this, I thought, 'This guy is robbing a bank but you really want him to get away with it.'"

Soderbergh cites Nicolas Roeg's 1973 film Don't Look Now as the primary influence on how he approached the love scene between Foley and Sisco: "What I wanted to create in our movie was the intimacy of that, the juxtaposition of these two contrasting things ... We had to mix it up and have you feel like you were more in their heads."

Danny DeVito and Garry Shandling were considered for the part of Ripley before Albert Brooks was cast.

The character Ray Nicolette also appears in Leonard's novel Rum Punch, which was being filmed as Jackie Brown when Universal Pictures was preparing to begin production on Out of Sight. After Michael Keaton was cast as the detective Nicolette in Jackie Brown, Universal subsequently cast him for a cameo in the same role in Out of Sight. While Miramax Films owned the rights to the character, due to the fact that Jackie Brown went into production first, director Quentin Tarantino felt it was imperative that Miramax not charge Universal for using the character, allowing the character's appearance without Miramax receiving financial compensation. Nicolette appears in only one brief scene, whereas the character was a much more substantial element of Jackie Brown.

Music
DJ David Holmes was originally hired to write a few sections of the film's theme music. Soderbergh liked what he did so much that he had Holmes score the rest of the film. Holmes spent six weeks working 12- to 17-hour days to finish the score in time for the film's release. He drew upon several influences, including Lalo Schifrin, Quincy Jones, Dean Martin, Miles Davis, Sun Ra, and Willie Bobo.

Release
Out of Sight was released on June 26, 1998, in 2,106 theaters and grossed USD 12 million on its opening weekend. It went on to gross $37.5 million domestically and $40.2 million in the rest of the world for a worldwide total of $77.7 million.

Critical reception
Out of Sight received critical acclaim. On Rotten Tomatoes, the film has a 94% approval rating, based on 95 reviews, with an average rating of 7.90/10. The site's critical consensus reads: "Steven Soderbergh's intelligently crafted adaptation of the Elmore Leonard novel is witty, sexy, surprisingly entertaining, and a star-making turn for George Clooney." On Metacritic, the film has a score of 85 out of 100, based on 30 reviews, indicating "universal acclaim."

Film critic Roger Ebert gave the film three and a half out of four stars and praised Clooney's performance, stating: "Clooney has never been better. A lot of actors who are handsome when young need to put on some miles before the full flavor emerges ... Here Clooney at last looks like a big screen star; the good-looking leading man from television is over with." Janet Maslin of The New York Times praised Lopez's performance, writing, "Ms. Lopez has her best movie role thus far, and she brings it both seductiveness and grit; if it was hard to imagine a hard-working, pistol-packing bombshell on the page, it couldn't be easier here." Andrew Sarris, in  his review for The New York Observer, wrote, "For once in a mainstream production, the narrative machinery works on all cylinders without any wasted motion or fatuous rhetoric. They don't make movies like this anymore, in this overcalculated and overtested era." In his review for the Los Angeles Times, Kenneth Turan wrote, "As always with the best of Leonard, it's the journey, not the destination, that counts, and director Soderbergh has let it unfold with dry wit and great skill. Making adroit use of complex flashbacks, freeze frames and other stylistic flourishes, he's managed to put his personal stamp on the film while staying faithful to the irreplaceable spirit of the original."

Entertainment Weekly gave the film a "B+" rating and Owen Gleiberman wrote, "This is Clooney's wiliest, most complex star turn yet. It helps that he's lost the Beverly Hills Caesar cut (he's actually more handsome with his hair swept back), and his performance is slyly two-tiered: Foley is all charming moxie on the surface, a bit clueless underneath." Richard Schickel, in his review for Time, wrote, "What makes this movie work is the kind of cool that made Get Shorty go so nicely: an understanding that life's little adventures rarely come in neat three-act packages, the way most movies now do, and the unruffled presentation of outrageously twisted dialogue, characters and situations as if they were the most natural things in the world." In her review for the L.A. Weekly, Manohla Dargis wrote, "This isn't a profound film, or even an important one, but then it isn't trying to be; it's so diverting and so full of small, satisfying pleasures, you don't realize how good it is until after it's over."

Accolades

American Film Institute Lists
 AFI's 100 Years...100 Thrills – Nominated
 AFI's 10 Top 10 – Nominated Gangster Film

Other Honors
 Entertainment Weekly voted it as the sexiest film ever on their "50 Sexiest Movies Ever" poll and ranked it #9 on their Top 25 Modern Romances list.
 In 2012, the Motion Picture Editors Guild listed Out of Sight as the 52nd best-edited film of all time based on a survey of its membership.

Impact and legacy
In later years, Soderbergh would see the film as "a very conscious decision on my part to try and climb my way out of the arthouse ghetto which can be as much of a trap as making blockbuster films." He had just turned down directing Human Nature, written by Charlie Kaufman, to direct Out of Sight. "And I was very aware that at that point in my career, half the business was off limits to me." Clooney said, "Out of Sight was the first time where I had a say, and it was the first good screenplay that I'd read where I just went, 'That's it.' And even though it didn't do really well box office-wise - we sort of tanked again - it was a really good film." Lopez said: "It kind of became a cult classic. It didn't get as much notice when it first came out at the box office but now, years later, so many people told me that was their favorite film. It's crazy."

See also
Heist film

References

External links

 
 
 
 
 "Back in Sight" article at the L.A. Weekly

1990s crime comedy films
1990s heist films
1990s prison films
1998 films
American crime comedy films
American heist films
American nonlinear narrative films
American prison comedy films
Edgar Award-winning works
1990s English-language films
Films about bank robbery
Films based on American novels
Films based on works by Elmore Leonard
Films directed by Steven Soderbergh
Films produced by Danny DeVito
Films set in Detroit
Films set in Miami
Films shot in Detroit
Films shot in Florida
Films shot in Michigan
Films with screenplays by Scott Frank
American police detective films
United States Marshals Service in fiction
Universal Pictures films
1998 comedy films
National Society of Film Critics Award for Best Film winners
Films scored by David Holmes (musician)
1990s American films